Mississippi Highway 588 (MS 588) is a  state highway running from U.S. Route 84 (US 84) outside of Collins to MS 29 in Ellisville in southern Mississippi.

Route description
The two lane road generally heads east through wooded areas though within the first , it passes facilities for various oil pipeline companies including TransMontaigne, Colonial Pipeline, and Plantation Pipeline. Continuing east from here, MS 588 passes through the settlements of Willowtown and Eminence. In the latter location, MS 588 intersects MS 535 at its northern terminus. Heading east, through a mix of open fields and woods, the highway enters Jones County from Covington County. MS 588 goes through the community of Oak Bowery, crosses the Oakey Woods Creek and Leaf River, and reaches Sand Hill. Near its end, the highway enters the town of Ellisville. It generally heads east until sharply curving to the north at Interstate 59 (I-59). About  later, MS 588 ends at an intersection with MS 29, immediately adjacent to I-59's exit 88, and Hal Crocker Road.

History
MS 588 was designated in 1956 generally running along the alignment it has today. The only change was made when its eastern terminus was shifted northwest along MS 29 due to the construction of I-59.

Major intersections

References

External links

588
Transportation in Covington County, Mississippi
Transportation in Jones County, Mississippi